The 1947 USC Trojans football team was an American football team that represented the University of Southern California (USC) as a member of the Pacific Coast Conference (PCC) during the 1947 college football season. In its sixth year under head coach Jeff Cravath, the team compiled a 7–2–1 record (6–0 against conference opponents), won the  PCC championship, was ranked No. 8 in the final AP Poll, and outscored opponents by a total of 193 to 114. The team lost to Notre Dame in the final game of the regular season and to Michigan in the 1948 Rose Bowl on New Year's Day.

Four USC players received first-team honors on the 1947 All-Pacific Coast football teams selected by the PCC coaches, the Associated Press (AP), and the United Press (UP): end Paul Cleary (Coaches-1, AP-1, UP-1); tackle John Ferraro (Coaches-1, AP-1, UP-1); halfback Don Doll (Coaches-1, AP-1, UP-1); and tackle Bob Hendren (AP-1). Cleary and Ferraro were later inducted into the College Football Hall of Fame.

The team played its home games at the Los Angeles Memorial Coliseum.

Schedule

Coaching staff
 Head coach: Jeff Cravath
 Assistant coaches: Roy "Bullet" Baker, Roy Engle, Norm Verry (asst. line coach), Sam Barry (chief scout), Pete McPhail (ends), Raymond George (head line coach)

References

USC
USC Trojans football seasons
Pac-12 Conference football champion seasons
USC Trojans football